Nemophora pfeifferella is a moth of the Adelidae family. It is found from France to Russia and from Germany and Poland to Bosnia and Herzegovina and Bulgaria.

References

External links
lepiforum.de
Species info at nkis.info

Moths described in 1813
Adelidae
Moths of Europe